The mixed pairs was one of four events in figure skating at the 1908 Summer Olympics. Each nation could enter up to 3 pairs (6 skaters). Twelve years later, silver medalist Phyllis Johnson would capture a bronze medal with a new partner at the 1920 Olympics.

Competition format

Each skater performed a five-minute free skate. Scores from 0 to 6 were given for each figure for both (a) content (difficulty and variety) and (b) performance. The total possible score was therefore 12. Each judge would then arrange the pairs in order of total score by that judge; these ordinal rankings were used to provide final placement for the pairs, using a "majority rule"--if a majority of the judges ranked a pair first, the pair won. If there was no majority, the total ordinals controlled. Ties were broken by total points.

Results

The judges were unanimous in ranking the German pair first. For second place, two judges scored a tie between the Johnsons and the Syerses, while three judges put the Johnsons clearly in second; this being a majority, the Johnsons received the silver medal.

Referee:
  Herbert G. Fowler

Judges:
  Hermann Wendt
  Gustav Hügel
  Horatio Torromé
  Harry D. Faith
  Georg Sanders

References

Sources
 
 De Wael, Herman. Herman's Full Olympians: "Figure skating 1908". Accessed 2 May 2006.

Pairs
1908 in figure skating
1908
Mixed events at the 1908 Summer Olympics